Zero is a 1928 British silent drama film directed by Jack Raymond and starring Stewart Rome, Fay Compton and Jeanne De Casalis. Based on the 1927 novel by H. Collinson Owen, it was made at Cricklewood Studios.

Premise
A writer fakes his own death and establishes a new identity in order to live with his mistress, but he returns to his wife when she becomes ill.

Cast
 Stewart Rome as John Garth 
 Fay Compton as Mrs Garth 
 Jeanne De Casalis as Julia Norton 
 Sam Livesey as Monty Sterling 
 Dorinea Shirley as Veronica Sterling 
 Joseph R. Tozer as Major Potterton 
 Lewis Shaw as Victor Garth

References

Bibliography
 Low, Rachael. History of the British Film, 1918–1929. George Allen & Unwin, 1971.

External links

1928 films
British drama films
British silent feature films
1928 drama films
1920s English-language films
Films directed by Jack Raymond
Films shot at Cricklewood Studios
Films based on British novels
British black-and-white films
Films set in England
Silent drama films
1920s British films